Karan Kandhari is an Indian filmwriter and director.

In 2009, Kandhari directed the short film Hard Hat, a melancholy tale of three immigrants who meet on a cash-in-hand construction job in London. The film was selected for numerous film festivals around the world, winning the Audience Award at the Rushes Soho Short Film Festival in 2010.

Critical response
"There is evidence of better things to come from British Asian directors, as Karan Kandhari demonstrates with Bye Bye Miss Goodnight. Offering a uniquely avant-garde snapshot of modern urban India, this visually ambitious road movie belies its modest budget to chronicle the unlikely encounter between a daydreaming Mumbai cabby and a pregnant, hitchhiking free spirit." - David Parkinson, BBC Film

References and notes

External links
 

English film directors
Living people
Year of birth missing (living people)
People from Kandahar
21st-century Indian film directors
Indian screenwriters